Events from the year 1134 in Ireland.

Incumbents
High King: Toirdelbach Ua Conchobair

Events

Consecration of Cormac’s Chapel at Cashel Building had started in 1127. It had been built by Cormac mac Carthaig, King of Munster and consecrated in the presence of a great assembly of church and royal dignitaries.

References